Orleans is an American drama television series created by  Toni Graphia and John Sacret Young, that aired on CBS from January 7 through April 10, 1997. It ran for 8 episodes. The series was said to be inspired by the experiences of creator/producer Toni Graphia, who was the daughter of a Louisiana judge.

Synopsis
The show was centered on the character of Judge Luther Charbonnet, portrayed by Larry Hagman. He was a judge seated in New Orleans and had a family that consisted of some wildly different characters. One of the sons was an assistant district attorney, another son was a police officer, and a daughter who ran a casino. An overall backstory to the series was that Judge Luther had another daughter who was missing or had been dead for years, and he had a search going on for information on her. Several "taboo" subjects were touched on this series, including interracial relationships (Judge Luther had a black girlfriend) and incest (the daughter had a relationship with her cousin).

The show was promoted heavily before it had aired in early 1997 However, the ratings were not great, and it was quickly moved to Friday nights in the same slot Hagman's previous series Dallas dominated for CBS. This would not be the case with Orleans and the series was cancelled at the end of its 1st season.

Cast
Larry Hagman.....Judge Luther Charbonnet 
Michael Reilly Burke.....Jesse Charbonnet 
Vanessa Bell Calloway.....Rosalee Clark 
Brett Cullen.....Clade Charbonnet 
Colleen Flynn.....Paulette Charbonnet 
Lynette Walden.....Rene Doucette 
O'Neal Compton.....Curtis Manzant
Charles Durning.....Frank Vitelli
Richard Fancy.....Vincent Carraze
Jerry Hardin.....Leon Gillenwater
Melora Hardin.....Gina Vitelli
Cotter Smith.....Bill Brennecke

Episode list

Awards and nominations

References

External links
  
 Page on Larry Hagman's Site

1990s American drama television series
1997 American television series debuts
1997 American television series endings
1990s American legal television series
English-language television shows
CBS original programming
Television shows set in New Orleans
Fictional portrayals of the New Orleans Police Department